Bouri may refer to:

People
 Bouri Sanhouidi (born 1949), Burkina Faso diplomat and economist
 Fatma Bouri (born 1993), Tunisian handball player for Club Africain and the Tunisian national team
 Wahbi al-Bouri (1916–2010), Libyan politician, diplomat, writer and translator

Places
 Bouri, Diabo, Burkina Faso (fr)
 Bouri, Sissy, Burkina Faso (fr)
 Bouri, Cameroon (fr)
 Bouri Field, Libya
 Bouri Formation, Ethiopia